Sami Belkorchia (born 25 January 1995) is a French professional footballer who plays as a centre-back for Le Puy.

Club career
Belkorchia began his senior career with the reserves of Saint-Étienne and Angers, failing to sign a professional contract. He spent a couple of years with the amateur clubs Saint-Chamond and Montbrison, where he almost quit football. He was scouted by Villefranche in the Championnat National. He transferred to Quevilly in the summer of 2020, and helped them get promoted into the professional Ligue 2 for the 2021–22 Ligue 2 season. He made his professional debut with Quevilly in a 3–0 Ligue 2 loss to Niort on 16 October 2021.

On 22 August 2022, Belkorchia joined Championnat National 2 side Angoulême Charente FC. However, a less than three weeks later, Belkorchia moved to newly promoted Championnat National side Le Puy.

Personal life
Born in France, Belkorchia is of Algerian descent.

References

External links
 
 QRM Profile

1995 births
Living people
French footballers
People from Montbrison, Loire
French sportspeople of Algerian descent
Sportspeople from Loire (department)
Footballers from Auvergne-Rhône-Alpes
Association football defenders
Andrézieux-Bouthéon FC players
AS Saint-Étienne players
Angers SCO players
FC Villefranche Beaujolais players
US Quevilly-Rouen Métropole players
Angoulême Charente FC players
Le Puy Foot 43 Auvergne players
Ligue 2 players
Championnat National players
Championnat National 2 players
Championnat National 3 players